Péter Szőke (8 August 1947 – 28 July 2022) was a Hungarian tennis player. He did not win any top-level titles during his professional career, finishing runner-up once in singles and four times in doubles.  He reached his highest ATP singles ranking of World No. 47 in August 1973.

Szőke participated in 27 Davis Cup ties for Hungary from 1967 and 1983, posting a 9–15 record in singles and a 17–6 record in doubles.

ATP tour finals

Singles (1 runner-up)

Doubles (4 runner-ups)

References

External links
 
 
 

1947 births
2022 deaths
20th-century Hungarian people
21st-century Hungarian people
Hungarian male tennis players
Tennis players from Budapest